The episode for the eleventh season of the anime series Naruto: Shippuden are based on Part II for Masashi Kishimoto's manga series. The anime only season aired from July to December 2011 and follows Naruto Uzumaki, Yamato, Aoba and Guy sailing through the ocean. The episodes are directed by Hayato Date, and produced by Studio Pierrot and TV Tokyo.

The season's English dub was streamed on Neon Alley from December 28, 2013 to May 17, 2014. The season would make its English television debut on Adult Swim's Toonami programming block and premiere from October 13, 2018 to March 24, 2019.

The season contains four musical themes between two openings and endings. The first opening theme,  by 7!! is used from episodes 222 to 230. The second opening theme, "newsong" by tacica is used from episodes 231 onwards. The first ending theme,  by OKAMOTO'S is used from episodes 222 to 230. The second ending theme, "Place to Try" by TOTALFAT is used from episodes 231 to 242. The fifth feature film, "Naruto the Movie: Blood Prison" was released on July 27, 2011. The broadcast versions of the episodes 223 to 227 include scenes from the film in the opening themes, while retaining the music "Lovers".


Episode list

Home releases

Japanese

English

Notes

References
General

Specific

2011 Japanese television seasons
Shippuden Season 11